Bridei was king of the Picts, in modern Scotland, from 843 to 845, contesting with Kenneth MacAlpin (Cináed III mac Ailpín/Ciniod III [son of] Elphin).  According to the Pictish Chronicle, he was the son of Uuthoil (or in Gaelic Fochel, Fotel; Fodel).

References

845 deaths
Pictish monarchs
9th-century Scottish monarchs
Year of birth unknown